Raúl Fernández-Cavada Mateos (born 13 March 1988) is a Spanish professional footballer who plays for Granada CF as a goalkeeper.

Club career
Born in Bilbao, Biscay, Fernández joined Athletic Bilbao's prolific youth system, Lezama, at the age of 10. He made his senior debut with the reserve side in the Segunda División B, then went on to spend two seasons on loan in the same tier, first with UB Conquense then Granada CF; with the latter club, he was the most utilised player in his position in a return to Segunda División after an absence of more than two decades.

Fernández was definitely promoted to Athletic's first team for 2010–11, following the retirement of veteran Armando. On 23 April 2011, as longtime starter Gorka Iraizoz was suspended following his fifth booking of the campaign, he made his La Liga debut, performing well in a 2–1 home win against Basque neighbours Real Sociedad.

On 10 July 2013, Fernández was loaned to CD Numancia from division two. On 18 July of the following year, he moved to Racing de Santander also in that tier, after agreeing to a one-year deal.

Fernández terminated his contract with the Cantabrians on 22 January 2015, and moved to Real Valladolid hours later. On 30 June, after acting as a backup to Javi Varas, he signed for CD Mirandés also in the second division.

On 1 July 2016, after appearing in 49 competitive games in his only season, free agent Fernández joined fellow league club Levante UD. On 23 July 2018, he signed for UD Las Palmas on a three-year contract.

In April 2019, Fernández suffered an injury during a match against Cádiz CF. Initially expected to miss the remainder of the campaign due to a hand and a left-knee injury, he spent the entire 2019–20 sidelined as well. After suffering a setback in his recovery he was subject to layoff by his club, which left him unregistered until January 2021; this decision was later revoked.

References

External links

1988 births
Living people
Spanish footballers
Footballers from Bilbao
Association football goalkeepers
La Liga players
Segunda División players
Segunda División B players
Tercera División players
CD Basconia footballers
Bilbao Athletic footballers
Athletic Bilbao footballers
UB Conquense footballers
Granada CF footballers
CD Numancia players
Racing de Santander players
Real Valladolid players
CD Mirandés footballers
Levante UD footballers
UD Las Palmas players